Khairapur is a town in Bardiya District in Lumbini Province of south-western Nepal. At the time of the 1991 Nepal census it had a population of 6,568 and had 1192 houses in the town.

References

Populated places in Bardiya District